Real is a studio album by the Japanese singer Mika Nakashima. The album was first released in Japan on January 30, 2013 (for the Valentine's Day season), in Regular and Limited editions.

The non-single track "Kioku" was used as the Casio Sheen commercial song. "Epilogue" was the ending theme song for the TV program GRACE OF JAPAN ~Shizen no Naka no Kami~.

This album debuted at number 1 in the Oricon weekly charts, and marked the first time in 4 years for the singer to top said chart for either a single or album since Voice (released in November 2008); it was also her first chart topping work in Japan after she made a comeback from the 6-month hiatus resulting from her patulous auditory tube disorder.

It has also been released in Taiwan and South Korea.

Some presses of the album come with a bookmark denoting the artist and album name on one side, and a picture of a flower with the words "Be Real...Be Mine" on the other side of the bookmark.

Tie-ins 
Three of the four singles on this album are songs from motion pictures (an uncommon feature among studio albums).

 "Dear" was the theme song for the Japanese television drama Yōkame no Semi.
 "Love Is Ecstasy" was a theme song for the movie Unfair 2: The Answer.
 "Ashita Sekai ga Owarunara" was the main theme song for the Japanese dub of Resident Evil: Retribution. In it, Nakashima reprised her cameo role from Resident Evil: Afterlife.
 "Hatsukoi" was the theme song for the 2012 live-action film adaptation of Kyō, Koi o Hajimemasu.

Track listing

Oricon sales charts (Japan)

Certifications

Release History

References

External links 
 Oricon Profile: Limited Edition | Regular Edition
 Sony Music Profile: Limited Edition | Regular Edition

Mika Nakashima albums
2013 albums